Sara Rai (Sārā Rāy, born 15 September 1956), is a contemporary Indian writer, editor of anthologies and translator of modern Hindi and Urdu fiction. She lives in Allahabad (Uttar Pradesh) and New Delhi, India. Rai mainly writes and publishes short stories in Hindi. Written in a reflective prose style, her stories explore the individual complexities in the lives of ordinary people and outsiders in contemporary India.

Background 
Sara Rai was born into a family of writers and artists based in Allahabad. Sara Rai's grandfather is the writer Dhanpat Rai Srivastava, better known by his pen name Munshi Premchand (Munśī Premcand). His second wife, Shivrani Devi (Śivrānī Devī, ?-1976), who was an active follower of Mahatma Gandhi, authored a memoir about her life with Premchand titled "Premcand ghar meṃ" ("Premchand at home", 1944). Sara Rai's father, the literary critic and painter Sripat Rai (Śrīpat Rāy, 1916-1994), was the founding editor of Kahani (Kahānī, 1937–39 and 1953–79), one of the leading literary journals of the Nayi Kahani (Nayī Kahānī) Movement. Her mother, Zahra Rai (Zahraʾ Rāy,1917-1993), also wrote and published short stories in Hindi. In her essay "You will be the Katherine Mansfield of Hindi", Sara Rai reflects her struggle of becoming a writer and finding her own literary voice in the multilingual and -cultural backgrounds of both her family and her home town Allahabad.

Education and career 
Sara Rai received a master's degree in Modern History from the Jawaharlal Nehru University, New Delhi, in 1978. Three years later, she accomplished her masters in English Literature at the University of Allahabad. Rai started writing at a young age. Her first story "Lucky Horace" was published in the Damn You magazine founded and edited by Arvind Krishna Mehrotra and Sara's cousins Alok and Amit Rai in the early 1960s.

Since the early 1990s, Rai has been working as a translator of fiction by Vinod Kumar Shukla, Premchand, Pankaj Bisht, Shaukat Hayat, Geetanjali Shree and others from Hindi and Urdu into English. She also translated a number of her own short stories into English. Besides, Rai took part in some film and theatre projects: She wrote the dialogues for the experimental Bombay documentary "Seven Islands and a Metro" (2004), directed by Madusree Dutta.

Rai's first novel, "House of Kites" (original Hindi title cīlvālī koṭhī), came out in 2010. The novel narrates the story of a formerly wealthy, educated and secular lineage of Hindu Banias, traders and accountants, and its gradual decay. The novel, which is set in the ancestral mansion (kothi) of the family in Varanasi (Benaras), is told from the perspectives of its members, among them the orphan Meena, who comes to the mansion as a companion to the family's daughter as a teenager. Meena and the eldest son of the house, Vikram, secretly fall in love with each other. Vikram, who holds a University degree but has no job, engages as social activist and fights for the rights of the poor. However, when the question of marriage arises, he agrees to marry a woman chosen by his parents instead of taking side for his true love (but presumably low-caste) Meena – which turns out a fatal decision.

Style of writing 
Rai's short stories depict the everyday lives and perceptions of individuals in contemporary India. They are mainly set in North Indian cities such as Delhi, Varanasi (Benares) or Allahabad. Her characters come from various social, economic and religious backgrounds. "On the brink" (kagār par), for example, is told from the perspective of a middle aged gay artist in Delhi who falls in love with a young migrant worker. "Babu Devidins new world" (Bābū Devidīn kī nayī duniyā) depicts the daily struggles of a hypochondriac pensioner, and "Criminal on the run" (mujrim farār) is a narration about a rapist who manages to escape after murdering a young woman but eventually loses his mind in the solitude of his hiding-place. According to the author, this story is based on the real case of the Shakti Mills gang rape that happened in 2013. The author is especially interested in how the clashes and conflicts of modern India surface in the daily life of her protagonists. Many topics of her stories are universal – the struggles of getting old in a quickly transforming world, the search for identity in turbulent times, and the experience of being socially excluded in terms of belonging to a ‘different’ class, gender, religion, or socio-economical background. The Hindi scholar Thomas de Bruijn states that „Rai’s work shows the evocative power of a literary idiom in which the heritage of many premodernities are accumulated. Its dialogic nature, refusing to be fixed to a single, monologic identity, makes it a perfect idiom for expressing the conundrum of modernity in a contemporary Indian context."

In order to narrate each story from a subjective perspective, Rai frequently applies the narrative device of the "stream-of-consciousness". This focus on individual perspectives in her writing draws a connection to the Nayi Kahani movement of the 1950s and 60s. Rai's interest in depicting the nuances of human feelings and interactions not only establishes a literary affinity to the Nayi Kahani in Hindi literature, but also to other modern and contemporary writers such as Anton Chekhov, Marcel Proust and Alice Munro.

Language 
By calling herself a "Hindustani writer", Rai positions herself in the shared linguistic and cultural tradition of South Asian Hindus and Muslims. This choice is reflected in the fact that many of her characters display distinctive idioms or different registers of Hindustani. For example, the old Muslim woman in "The Labyrinth" (bhūlbhulaiyāṁ) is strongly influenced by Perso-Arabic vocabulary referring to the Nawabi culture of the 19th century. In other stories, such as in "Criminal on the run" (mujrim farār), Rai uses a colloquial style to imitate a mix of illiterate local dialect and urban Bollywood slang as spoken in Mumbai.

Reception 
In India, Sara Rai's writing has been receiving growing attention among writers, critics and readers alike. Nirmal Verma states in the preface of Rai's first book Abābīl kī uṛān: „If the secret of art is concealed in [E. M.] Forster’s "Only Connect" comment, it is Sara Rai's extraordinary talent of searching for a connection between most unrelated things and bringing to light an astonishing truth." Although, she is relatively unknown outside India, her stories have been translated into Urdu, English, German and Italian language.

Bibliography

Fiction 
 2022 Nabīlā aur anya kahāniyāṁ (Nabeela and other stories). Delhi: Rajkamal Prakashan.
 2015 Bhūlbhulaiyāṁ (The Labyrinth and other stories). Bikaner: Surya Prakashan Mandir.
2010 Cīlvālī koṭhī (House of Kites, novel). Delhi: Harper Hindi. Delhi: Rajkamal Prakashan.
2005 Biyābān Meṃ (In the Wilderness, story collection). Delhi: Rajkamal Prakashan.
1997 Abābīl kī uṛān (The Swallow's Flight, story collection). Delhi: Rajkamal Prakashan.

Edited works in English translation 
 2019 Blue Is Like Blue: Stories by Vinod Kumar Shukla. (ed. and transl. with Arvind Krishna Mehrotra). Delhi: HarperCollins.
 2013 Kazaki and Other Marvellous Tales by Premchand. (ed. and transl.) Delhi: Book Mine, Hachette India.
 2003 Hindi Handpicked Fictions. (ed. and transl.) Delhi: Katha.  
 2000 Babbarsingh and His Friends, Novella for Children by Shrilal Shukla. Delhi: Scholastic India
 1999 Imaging the Other (co-edited with GJV Prasad). Delhi: Katha.
 1996 Bholu and Golu, Novella for Children by Pankaj Bisht. Delhi: National Book Trust of India.  
 1990 The Golden Waist-Chain - Modern Hindi Short Stories. (ed. and transl.) Delhi : Penguin India.

Selected essays and stories in English translation 
 2017 "Old Veranda" by Vinod Kumar Shukla (tr. with Arvind Krishna Mehrotra) in n+1 No. 28. New York.
 2013 "Reading Godaan" (essay) in Sebastian and Siddan eds. 50 Writers 50 Books. Delhi: Harper Collins.
 2011 "Vagabond Beneath the Stars" by Gyanranjan (from Hindi original)  in  Arvind Krishna Mehrotra ed. The Last Bungalow: Writings on Allahabad. Delhi: Penguin.
 2003 "Our Small World" (written and transl.) in Sara Rai ed. Hindi Handpicked Fictions. Delhi : Katha.
 1979 "Realism as a Creative Process: Features of Munshi Premchand's Ideology" (essay) in Social Scientist, Delhi.

Awards and honours 
 2019 Atta Galatta Prize of the Bangalore Literary Festival in the category fiction (translation of "Blue is like Blue" by Vinod Kumar Shukla).
2019 Rueckert Prize of the City of Coburg (Germany).
2003 Writer, Japan-India Writers' Caravan, Tokyo and Yamagata.
2003 Charles Wallace Fellowship, Translator-in-Residence at The British Centre for Literary Translation, University of East Anglia, United Kingdom.
2002 Writer, Japan-India Writers' Caravan, Delhi.
2000 AK Ramanujan Award for translating from more than two languages.
1997 Katha Translation Award.
1993 Katha Translation Award supported by the British Council.

See also
 List of Indian writers

References 

1956 births
Living people
Writers from Allahabad
Indian women writers
Jawaharlal Nehru University alumni
University of Allahabad alumni